Grevillea banyabba, commonly known as Banyabba grevillea, is a species of flowering plant in the family Proteaceae and is endemic to north-eastern New South Wales. It is an open shrub with simple, narrowly egg-shaped leaves with the narrower end towards the base, and red and green flowers.

Description
Flowering mostly occurs from August to October and the fruit is a follicle with a few long, soft hairs, and that splits down one side to release flat, winged seeds.

Taxonomy
Grevillea banyabba was first formally described in 1994 by Peter M. Olde and Neil R. Marriott in the journal Telopea, based on plant material near Grafton in 1992. The specific epithet (banyabba) refers to the Banyabba Nature Reserve, to which this species is mostly confined.

Distribution and habitat
Banyabba grevillea grows in sandy soil on or near the tip of ridges in forest, mostly in the Banyabba Nature Reserve north-west of Grafton.

Conservation status
This grevillea is listed as "vulnerable" under the Australian Government Environment Protection and Biodiversity Conservation Act 1999 and the New South Wales Government Biodiversity Conservation Act 2016.

References

banyabba
Proteales of Australia
Flora of New South Wales
Plants described in 1994